We're Only in It for the Drugs is the debut album by the Swedish punk rock band Ebba Grön's, first released in November 1979. Most of the songs were recorded in September and October 1979 with Mistlurs mobile 8-channel mixer table in a closed industrial office on Fatbursgatan in Södermalm, Stockholm.

The title is a play on the 1968 Frank Zappa album We're Only in It for the Money.

Track listing

References

1979 debut albums
Ebba Grön albums